Regurgitator is a compilation album by H3llb3nt, released on May 29, 2001 by Invisible Records. It contains tracks drawn from the band's first two releases, 0.01 and Helium.

Track listing

Personnel 
Adapted from the Regurgitator liner notes.

 Bryan Barton – electric guitar, programming, vocals, musical arrangement, cover art, design
 Charles Levi – bass guitar
 Jared Louche – vocals, musical arrangement
 Eric Powell – electric guitar, programming, vocals, musical arrangement

Release history

References

External links 
 Regurgitator at Discogs (list of releases)

2001 compilation albums
H3llb3nt albums
Invisible Records albums